The Heywood-class attack transport was a class of US Navy attack transport built in 1919 that saw service in World War II.

Like all attack transports, the purpose of the Heywood class ships was to transport troops and their equipment to hostile shores in order to execute amphibious invasions. To fulfill their mission, attack transports were fitted with a substantial number of integral landing craft, and were well armed with antiaircraft weaponry to protect themselves and their vulnerable cargo of troops from air attack in the battle zone.

Background
The Heywood class is amongst the few classes of attack transport that were converted from pre-war tonnage rather than built from either Maritime Commission or Victory ship hull types during the war.

The origins of the Heywood class go back to the U.S. entry into World War I. At that time, the US Shipping Board was set up to modernize America's merchant cargo fleet, and to provide ships suitable for service as naval auxiliaries. They were known as the "444 class" after their length in feet.

Although they arrived too late to see service in the First World War, four ships of the class were duly completed in 1919. As the Navy no longer had use for them, they remained idle in the hands of the USSB through the 1920s, but around 1930 they were purchased by the Baltimore Steamship Company and substantially modified into passenger/cargo vessels according to a Gibbs & Cox design. Baltimore Steamship subsequently employed them on passenger, fast freight and mail runs between various US ports and between the US and Europe.

In November–December 1940, the US Navy acquired all four of the ships and converted them into troop transports, a process that took three to five months. The ships subsequently entered service between November 1940 and May 1941. In 1942, they underwent further modification into attack transports.

In service
The ships saw most of their action in the Pacific Theatre, but the William P. Biddle also participated in Operation Torch (the North African landings), and both Biddle and Neville took part in the invasion of Sicily. All but Biddle took part in the Guadalcanal campaign, and all four participated in various other Pacific Theatre landings. The class as a whole earned 28 battle stars for World War II service, an average of seven stars apiece.

Immediately after the war, most of the ships were occupied in deploying troops for occupation duties in newly conquered Japan and in bringing home demobilizing servicemen in Operation Magic Carpet.

All four ships were decommissioned shortly after the war in March–April 1946. They appear to have been scrapped in the mid-1950s.

References
See the individual DANFS Online ship entries for Heywood, Fuller, William P. Biddle and Neville. Further information at the individual ship entries in the Navsource Online APA Index.